Karavayinka is a rural locality (a selo) in Gornobalykleyskoye Rural Settlement, Dubovsky District, Volgograd Oblast, Russia. The population was 102 as of 2010. There are 11 streets.

Geography 
Karavayinka is located in steppe, on the west bank of the Volgograd Reservoir, 93 km northeast of Dubovka (the district's administrative centre) by road. Studenovka is the nearest rural locality.

References 

Rural localities in Dubovsky District, Volgograd Oblast